Lists of football stadiums in Ireland include lists of Gaelic football stadiums, and of association football stadiums in the Republic of Ireland and in Northern Ireland.

Gaelic football
 List of Gaelic Athletic Association stadiums

Association football (soccer)

 List of association football venues in the Republic of Ireland
 List of association football stadiums in Northern Ireland

See also

 List of stadiums in Ireland by capacity
 List of European stadiums by capacity

Football stadiums